Andrea Bræin Hovig (born 19 July 1973) is a Norwegian actress.

She graduated from the Norwegian National Academy of Theatre in 1998, and has since acted both at Det Norske Teatret (the Norwegian Theater) and at Nationaltheatret (the National Theatre). At Nationaltheatret she has had roles such as "Juliet" in Shakespeare's Romeo and Juliet, and "Hilde" in Ibsen's The Lady from the Sea. In 2000 she received Anders Jahre's cultural award for young artists. Hovig has also acted in films and on television, such as De 7 dødssyndene (The 7 Deadly Sins, 2000) and "Berlinerpoplene" (TV, 2007). She is also a singer, and has acted in the musical Chicago, and released an album of standard songs. In 2018 she portrayed school teacher, Elin Müller Schulman in Kielergata.

Hovig is married to the musician Andreas Utnem, and the two have one child together.

References

External links

Biography from Nationaltheateret.
List of roles at Nationaltheateret.

1973 births
Living people
Norwegian stage actresses
Oslo National Academy of the Arts alumni
Norwegian film actresses
Norwegian television actresses
Norwegian musical theatre actresses